Gaylord Nunatak is a nunatak rising to about ,  north-northeast of Schmutzler Nunatak in the southeast end of the Grossman Nunataks, Ellsworth Land, Antarctica. It was mapped by the United States Geological Survey (USGS) from surveys and U.S. Navy aerial photographs, 1961–68, and from Landsat imagery, 1973–74. It was named by the Advisory Committee on Antarctic Names in 1987 after Chauncey L. Gaylord, a USGS cartographer, 1942–76, Chief of the Compilation Unit in the Branch of Special Maps, working for many years in the preparation of Antarctic maps.

References

Nunataks of Palmer Land